Nathaniel Pilch (4 September 1793 – 1881) was an English first-class cricketer who played for Norfolk from 1820 to 1836. He was the elder brother of Fuller Pilch. Pilch is recorded in six matches, totalling 173 runs with a highest score of 52, holding 6 catches and taking 3 wickets.

References

Bibliography
 

English cricketers
English cricketers of 1787 to 1825
English cricketers of 1826 to 1863
Norfolk cricketers
1793 births
1881 deaths
People from Brisley
Sportspeople from Norfolk
People from Erpingham